Duke Li of Qi (died 816 BC) was from 824 to 816 BC the ninth recorded ruler of the State of Qi during the Western Zhou dynasty of ancient China.  His personal name was Lü Wuji (呂無忌), ancestral name Jiang (姜), and Duke Li was his posthumous title.

Duke Li succeeded his father Duke Wu of Qi, who died in 825 BC, as ruler of Qi.  He was a despotic ruler, and in 816 BC the people of Qi rebelled against him and tried to make the son of Duke Hu of Qi, Duke Li's grand-uncle, the new ruler.  Duke Li was killed by the rebels, but Duke Hu's son also died in the fighting.  Subsequently Duke Li's son Duke Wen ascended the throne, and executed 70 people who were responsible for Duke Li's death.

Family
Sons:
 Prince Chi (d. 804 BC), ruled as Duke Wen of Qi from 815–804 BC

Ancestry

References

Monarchs of Qi (state)
9th-century BC Chinese monarchs
816 BC deaths
Year of birth unknown
9th-century BC murdered monarchs
Assassinated Chinese politicians